Willie Bryce (16 January 1901 – 22 February 1983) was a Scotland international rugby union player with his regular playing position being Scrum half; and a Scotland international field hockey player.

Rugby Union career

Amateur career

Bryce played for Selkirk.

Provincial career

Bryce played for South of Scotland District.

International career

Bryce was capped for Scotland 11 times, between 1922 and 1924. He scored 3 tries for his country.

On his last match for Scotland, against Ireland in 1924, he suffered a shoulder injury which ended his rugby union career; and forced Bryce to switch sports.

Field Hockey career

Club career

Bryce played field hockey for Selkirk. He played on several occasions at Berwick.

International career

Bryce won 15 international caps for Scotland.

References

1983 deaths
1901 births
Rugby union players from Bolton
Scotland international rugby union players
Scotland men's international field hockey players
Scottish male field hockey players
Scottish rugby union players
Selkirk RFC players
South of Scotland District (rugby union) players
Rugby union scrum-halves